Annie Kriegel, née Annie Becker (born 9 September 1926, Paris; died 26 August 1995, Paris) was a French historian, a leading expert on communist studies and the history of Communism, a cofounder (1982) of the academic journal Communisme (with Stéphane Courtois), and a columnist for Le Figaro.

As a student, Kriegel was a member of the French Communist Party but changed her political views after the Soviet invasion of Hungary in 1956 and became an outspoken anticommunist.

Her brother was the historian Jean-Jacques Becker, and she was married to Arthur Kriegel, a brother of Maurice Kriegel-Valrimont. The Association d'études et de recherches en sciences sociales Annie Kriegel is named in her honour.

Selected works
1920. Le Congrès de Tours. Naissance du PCF, Paris, Julliard, 1964.
Les Communistes français : essai d'ethnographie politique, Paris, Seuil, 1968.
Les Grands Procès dans les systèmes communistes, Paris, Gallimard, 1972.
Communismes au miroir français, Paris, Gallimard, 1974. 
Ce que j'ai cru comprendre (mémoires), Paris, Robert Laffont, 1991, 842 p.

References

1926 births
1995 deaths
École Normale Supérieure alumni
Historians of communism
French anti-communists
Writers from Paris
French columnists
20th-century French historians
French women historians
Female resistance members of World War II
French women writers
French women columnists
20th-century French women
Le Figaro people